Hoy Gising! is a Philippine news program on ABS-CBN. Originally anchored by Ted Failon and Korina Sanchez and later in 1996 Sanchez replaced by Gel Santos-Relos, it premieres on May 4, 1992, replacing Isabel, Sugo ng Birhen. The newscast concluded on March 2, 2001. Originally as a segment of the flagship national network news broadcast TV Patrol, it eventually metamorphosed into a long-running public service program. Connie Sison, Francis Pangilinan and Aljo Bendijo serve as final anchors. In June 26, 2004, the program was revived for Saturday afternoon airings as Hoy Gising! Kapamilya.

Origin and format
Hoy Gising! was a public service program that began on TV Patrol as a segment handled by Frankie Evangelista. It grew into a half-hour program, later extended to an hour, chiefly anchored by Kris Aquino, Ted Failon, and Korina Sanchez. The show covered various problems associated with the government, as well as social issues, using a semi-humorous style of commentary on the featured issues and problems.

The show was directed by Rolly G. Reyes, who also wrote the lyrics of the theme song (set to the tune of Shame and Scandal by Trini Lopez) and created the segment titles. The show had a mambo-themed opening song performed by The Kumbancheros.

One of its weekly highlights every Friday was a summary of covered social and government-related complaints and issues in the show, and their statuses; the Honor Roll where solutions and actions to raised problems were lauded, and Horror Roll, where persisting and standstill issues are scorned and rounded up, to the tune of Wake Up Little Susie, and for the last entry, Taps. 

The show also had provincial versions in Bacolod, Cebu and Davao.

Hosts

Original hosts
 Ted Failon (1992–2000)
 Korina Sanchez (1992–1996)
 Gel Santos-Relos (1996–2001)
 Ruth Abao-Espinosa
 Henry Omaga-Diaz (1997–2001)
 Connie Sison (1998–2001)
 Kata Inocencio
 Erwin Tulfo
 Aljo Bendijo (2000–2001)
 Kris Aquino (1992)
 Pia Hontiveros
 Francis "Kiko" Pangilinan (1995–1997; 1998-2001)
 Julius Babao 
 Daniel Razon
 Amy Perez
Ilong Ranger (a cowboy in white shirt, shorts, cowboy hat, and gas mask who catches smoke-belching vehicles and factories emitting toxic smoke, played by Jose Rhoderick De Belen.)

Other staff working on the show included Doris Bigornia and Teodoro Casiño.

See also
List of shows previously aired by ABS-CBN
Failon Ngayon
TV Patrol

References

External links
 

Philippine television news shows
1992 Philippine television series debuts
2001 Philippine television series endings
ABS-CBN original programming
ABS-CBN News and Current Affairs shows
Filipino-language television shows